Covington High School is a public high school in Covington, Louisiana, United States. It is one of the Saint Tammany Parish Public Schools.

The school serves residents of Covington, Folsom, Sun, and some unincorporated areas in western St. Tammany Parish, including Bush and Lee Road.

2021 Social Media Incident
Covington High School received attention in 2021 after a student attacked a teacher unprovoked while a friend recorded the incident via cell phone video, allegedly as part of a TikTok challenge to slap a teacher.  The teacher was 64 years old and disabled.

Athletics
Covington High athletics competes in the LHSAA, and offers a variety of athletic opportunity for students.

Championships
Football championships
(1) State Championship: 1976

Football
Coaches
 Joseph "Jack" Salter - LHSAA Hall of Fame head football coach, Jack Salter, was head coach at Covington High from 1963 to 1995. During his thirty-three seasons at the school, he compiled a 256–110–8 record and won fifteen district championships, won a state championship in 1976 along with state runners-up in 1975 and 1987. The Covington High football stadium is named after Salter.

Athletic Opportunity 
As of the 2022-23 school year, Covington High School offered the following sports:

 Baseball
 Basketball (Male and female; Varsity and JV)
 Cheerleading
 Cross Country
 Football (Male; Varsity and JV)
 Golf
 Powerlifting
 Soccer (Male and female)
 Softball
 Swim
 Tennis
 Track
 Volleyball
 Wrestling

Notable alumni
 Vincent Alexander, former NFL player
 Curt Baham, former NFL player
 Jerry Davis, former NFL player
 Dave Fortman, music producer, guitarist for the band Ugly Kid Joe
 Clay Higgins, law enforcement officer, member of the United States House of Representatives for Louisiana's 3rd congressional district
 Tramain Jacobs, New York Giants NFL player
 Otha Peters, former NFL player
 Blake Stein, former MLB player (Oakland Athletics, Kansas City Royals)
 Lauren Turner, singer/songwriter, American Idol season 10 contestant
 Mike Williams, former NFL player

References

External links
 School website
 Saint Tammany Parish School Board
 Covington High Class of 1986 reunion forums

Public high schools in Louisiana
Schools in St. Tammany Parish, Louisiana
Educational institutions established in 1913
1913 establishments in Louisiana